Upper Hunter, an electoral district of the Legislative Assembly in the Australian state of New South Wales, has had three incarnations, the first from 1859 to 1894, the second from 1904 to 1920, and the third from 1927 to the present.


Members

Election results

Elections in the 2020s

2021

Elections in the 2010s

2019

2015

2011

Elections in the 2000s

2007

2003

Elections in the 1990s

1999

1995

1991

Elections in the 1980s

1988

1984

1981

Elections in the 1970s

1978

1976

1973

1971

1970 by-election

Elections in the 1960s

1968

1965

1962

Elections in the 1950s

1959

1956

1953

1950

Elections in the 1940s

1947

1944

1941

Elections in the 1930s

1939 by-election

1938

1935

1932

1931 by-election

1930

Elections in the 1920s

1927
This section is an excerpt from 1927 New South Wales state election § Upper Hunter

1920 - 1927
District abolished

Elections in the 1910s

1918 by-election

1917
This section is an excerpt from 1917 New South Wales state election § Upper Hunter

1913
This section is an excerpt from 1913 New South Wales state election § Upper Hunter

1910
This section is an excerpt from 1910 New South Wales state election § The Upper Hunter

1910 by-election

Elections in the 1900s

1907
This section is an excerpt from 1907 New South Wales state election § The Upper Hunter

1904
This section is an excerpt from 1904 New South Wales state election § The Upper Hunter

1894 - 1904
District abolished

1891
This section is an excerpt from 1891 New South Wales colonial election § The Upper Hunter

Elections in the 1880s

1889
This section is an excerpt from 1889 New South Wales colonial election § The Upper Hunter

1887
This section is an excerpt from 1887 New South Wales colonial election § The Upper Hunter

1885
This section is an excerpt from 1885 New South Wales colonial election § The Upper Hunter

1883 by-election

1882
This section is an excerpt from 1882 New South Wales colonial election § The Upper Hunter

1880
This section is an excerpt from 1880 New South Wales colonial election § The Upper Hunter

Elections in the 1870s

1877
This section is an excerpt from 1877 New South Wales colonial election § The Upper Hunter

1875 by-election 2

1875 by-election 1

1874
This section is an excerpt from 1874-75 New South Wales colonial election § The Upper Hunter

1872
This section is an excerpt from 1872 New South Wales colonial election § The Upper Hunter

Elections in the 1860s

1869
This section is an excerpt from 1869-70 New South Wales colonial election § The Upper Hunter

1868 by-election

1864
This section is an excerpt from 1864–65 New South Wales colonial election § The Upper Hunter

1861 by-election

1860
This section is an excerpt from 1860 New South Wales colonial election § The Upper Hunter

Elections in the 1850s

1859
This section is an excerpt from 1859 New South Wales colonial election § The Upper Hunter

Notes

References

New South Wales state electoral results by district